The twelfth Minnesota Legislature first convened on January 4, 1870. The 11 members of the Minnesota Senate who represented even-numbered districts were chosen in the General Election of November 3, 1868, while the 11 members of the Minnesota Senate who represented odd-numbered districts, and the 47 members of the Minnesota House of Representatives, were chosen in the General Election of November 2, 1869.

Sessions 
The legislature met in a regular session from January 4, 1870 to March 4, 1870. There were no special sessions of the 12th Minnesota Legislature.

Party summary

Senate

House of Representatives

Leadership

Senate 
Lieutenant Governor
William H. Yale (R-Winona)

House of Representatives 
Speaker of the House
John L. Merriam (R-Saint Paul)

Members

Senate

House of Representatives

Notes

References 

 Minnesota Legislators Past & Present - Session Search Results (Session 12, Senate)
 Minnesota Legislators Past & Present - Session Search Results (Session 12, House)
 Journal of the Senate of the Twelfth Session of the Legislature of the State of Minnesota
 Journal of the House of Representatives of the Twelfth Session of the Legislature of the State of Minnesota

12th
1870s in Minnesota